Toto Bona Lokua is a studio album by French songwriter and multi-instrumentalist Gerald Toto, Cameroonian jazz musician Richard Bona, and Congolese singer-songwriter Lokua Kanza. It was released on April 20, 2004 through No Format!.

Track listing

Chart performance

References

Richard Bona albums
2004 albums
Lokua Kanza albums
Gerald Toto albums
Sunnyside Records albums